Tarushcancha (Ancash Quechua taruka, tarush deer, kancha corral, "deer corral") or Chaqchipuncu is a  mountain in the Cordillera Blanca in the Andes of Peru. It is situated in the Ancash Region, Asunción Province, Chacas District. Tarushcancha lies in Huascarán National Park, northeast of Atlante and southeast of Yacuihuarmi.

References

Mountains of Peru
Mountains of Ancash Region
Huascarán National Park